Thanthai Hans Roever College, is a general degree college located in Perambalur, Tamil Nadu. It was established in the year 1985. The college is affiliated with Bharathidasan University. This college offers different courses in arts, commerce and science.
Thanthai Hans Roever College of Arts and Science is an educational institution run by the St. John Sangam Trust. It was established in 1985, as a religious minority institution in memory of Rev. Fr. Hans Roever, a missionary from Germany, with the primary objective of providing higher education to the weaker and backward sections of the society in general and the Christian minority   in  particular. The   trust   is   now   run   under   the   efficient   and   benevolent   leadership   of  the  founder – chairman, Dr. K. Varadharaajen who is hailed not only as an inspiring Father of Education but also as the Foundation-Head of wisdom and un paralleled service to humanity. His Vision and mission include a relentless pursuit to provide qualitative education, to empower the youth through updated knowledge and adequate skills, to faster socio-economic and culture changes leading to sustainable growth and evolution, especially to the youth from backward and rural areas. The College is a self-financing and co-educational institution, affiliated to Bharathidasan Universityand approved by the University Grants Commission, New Delhi.

Departments

Science

Physics
Chemistry
Mathematics
Biotechnology
Computer Science
Botany
Zoology

Arts and Commerce

Tamil
English
History
Economics
Commerce

Accreditation
The college is  recognized by the University Grants Commission (UGC).

References

External links
http://www.roevercollege.ac.in/

Educational institutions established in 1985
1985 establishments in Tamil Nadu
Colleges affiliated to Bharathidasan University